Mitsugu Watanabe (Watanabe Mitsugu; 4 March 1928 – 12 June 2022) was a Japanese politician. A member of the Japanese Communist Party, he served in the House of Representatives from 1979 to 1983.

Watanabe died in Saitama Prefecture on 12 June 2022 at the age of 94.

References

1928 births
2022 deaths
Japanese Communist Party politicians
Members of the House of Representatives (Jordan)
Members of the House of Representatives from Saitama Prefecture
Chuo University alumni
Politicians from Tokyo
20th-century Japanese politicians